Prem Prem Paglami is a Bangladeshi romantic and action drama film directed by Shafi Uddin Shafi. The film was produced by Diganta Kathchitra. The film featured Bappy Chowdhury, Achol, Amit Hasan and Shiva Shanu. Prem Prem Paglami was released on 60 screens. According to the Dhaka Tribune, the film received positive responses from the audience and "did good business". The movie is a remake of 2008 Indian Telugu language movie Krishna.

Plot

Cast
 Bappy Chowdhury as Romeo
 Achol as  Simi
 Amit Hasan as Virus
 Danny Sidak
 Kazi Hayat
 Shiba Shanu as PC
 Afzal Sharif as Mama (Uncle)
 Nasrin
 Bipasha Kabir as Item girl
 Mohasin Hossain Dipu Howlader

Singer
 S. I. Tutul
 Dinat Jahan Munni
 Moon
 Soroliphi

Soundtrack

References

2013 films
2013 action drama films
2013 romantic drama films
Bengali-language Bangladeshi films
Bangladeshi action drama films
Bangladeshi romantic drama films
2010s Bengali-language films
Bangladeshi films about revenge